The Formula One United States Grand Prix was held on the Phoenix street circuit in Phoenix, Arizona, between 1989 and 1991. It was held in downtown by the Phoenix Civic Plaza and the America West Arena, prior to the introduction of the state's baseball stadium, Bank One Ballpark. The United States Grand Prix lasted in Phoenix for three years, but was inexplicably dropped by Formula One management. There were no further Formula One races in the US until the Indianapolis Motor Speedway first held a Grand Prix in 2000.

Summary
In 1986 former race car driver and businessman Guy Gonyea approached then Mayor Terry Goddard about the possibility of the city of Phoenix hosting a round of the FIA Formula One World Championship in order to increase the city’s world-wide visibility as a major tourist destination. With the support of Goddard and city officials Gonyea conducted an extensive feasibility study, gaining the support of 37 of the city's leading business organizations including the Chamber of Commerce, the Fiesta Bowl collegiate football committee and Congressman Jon Kyl. Having gained overwhelming support, Gonyea subsequently met in Paris, France with then President of the Federation Internationale de l'Automobile (FIA) J-M Balestre and Bernie Ecclestone the head of the Formula One organization and presented plans for a race. Ecclestone was enthusiastic about the possibility of replacing the current Detroit Formula One Grand Prix and agreed for further meetings with Gonyea. A second meeting took place at the 1987 Detroit Grand Prix between Gonyea, Ecclestone, George Couzens, head of the Sports Car Club of America (SCCA), Burdie Martin, head of the Automobile Competition Committee for the US (ACCUS) and Chris Pook, Long Beach Indy Grand Prix race promoter. The "Phoenix Grand Prix Committee" was established to negotiate with Ecclestone the terms for hosting the event but one immediate problem was that Detroit had a valid contract to host the US Grand Prix until 1991. However, in October 1988, Detroit refused to invest money into improving Grand Prix facilities demanded by Ecclestone and decided to run an Indy car event instead of Formula 1 in 1989. On January 13, 1989, the Phoenix City Council headed by mayor Terry Goddard agreed to stage an annual Formula 1 race on a five-year contract. Phoenix City Council also voted to spend $9 million of taxpayers' money on race circuit infrastructure over the 5 years. It was well known to organizers that Phoenix can be very hot during summer, but nonetheless, Phoenix inherited the Detroit race's scheduled slot of June 4, 1989. This required fencing off and repaving the road surface, as well as building grandstands, garages for the pit crew, and other infrastructure. The project was so massive that local media joked that the city looked as if it were preparing for a Soviet invasion.

In the inaugural race in 1989, Ayrton Senna took the pole in his McLaren-Honda but suffered an electronic failure a little over halfway through the race. The heat of the Phoenix desert was hard on teams and drivers, and only 6 of 26 cars finished. Alain Prost, Senna's teammate, won the race ahead of Riccardo Patrese and Phoenix native Eddie Cheever.

In an attempt to beat the scorching heat, the event date was changed to become the season opener the next year. It was held on March 11, 1990. Senna won. Jean Alesi finished 2nd.

Again reliability was a factor, with only nine cars still running at the end of the race. For a second straight season both Tyrrells finished in the points; Stefano Modena, who had replaced the Ferrari-bound Alesi, in fourth heading Nakajima in fifth.

Cancellation
On August 22, 1991, Bernie Ecclestone faxed a message to the City of Phoenix indicating that the Formula 1 race would be held there on March 15, 1992. On September 21, 1991, the City of Phoenix hired Buddy Jobe, the owner of Phoenix International Raceway to be consultant for the city for the next event. On October 7, 1991, however, Ecclestone called the City of Phoenix from his London office to say that Formula 1 would not be returning to Phoenix, giving no explanation as to why. Phoenix City Manager David Garcia said that Ecclestone agreed to pay the city $1.2 million for cancellation of the contract, and that the reason for cancellation may have been a desire to add a South African Grand Prix since apartheid had ended. During the 1992 South African Grand Prix, Ecclestone was asked whether poor attendance was to blame for the cancellation of the Phoenix race; Ecclestone replied that the issue was not the lack of spectators, but "the inability to put more than 20,000 seats in a position where people could see [more than] a small part of the race".

Legacy
On August 12, 2017 new Formula 1 boss Chase Carey criticized Ecclestone for going for too many short term deals in the USA, stating "You have to capture people’s imagination. You don’t do that with Phoenix, but in New York or Miami." In May 2019, Scottsdale, Arizona resident Eric Schultz commissioned a mural of Ayrton Senna to be painted by artist Mallory Dawn on Central Avenue, 1 km south of the former circuit, to honor his two wins there. The mural depicts Senna looking north towards the track's former location.

See also
 Grand Prix Arizona – a planned Champ Car race to be held on a different street circuit in Phoenix

References

Formula One circuits
Defunct motorsport venues in the United States
Sports venues in Phoenix, Arizona
Motorsport venues in Arizona
United States Grand Prix
Defunct sports venues in Arizona